Twilly may refer to:

 Twilly Cannon (1955–2016), American environmental and social justice activist
 Willy (textile machine), also called a twilly
 Twilly Spree, a character in the 2000 novel Sick Puppy by Carl Hiaasen